The Peninsula Panthers are a junior "B" ice hockey team based in North Saanich, British Columbia,  Canada. They are members of the South Division of the Vancouver Island Junior Hockey League (VIJHL). The Panthers play their home games at Panorama Recreation Centre. Coreen Zubersky is the team's president, Pete Zubersky is the general manager and Chris Driebergen is the head coach.

History

The Panthers joined the league in the early 1980s as an expansion team, named as the Peninsula Eagles. In its VIJHL history, the team has won the Cyclone Taylor Cup once, in 2011. The Panthers have won the Brent Patterson Memorial Trophy four times in 1989, 2010, 2011 and 2022. They won the Andy Hebenton Trophy five times, as the team with the league's best regular season record in 1988, 1989, 2004, 2008 and 2009.

Season-by-season record

Note: GP = Games played, W = Wins, L = Losses, T = Ties, OTL = Overtime Losses, Pts = Points, GF = Goals for, GA = Goals against

Accurate as of 2020-21 season.

Cyclone Taylor Cup
British Columbia Jr B Provincial Championships
 Campbell River VIJHL Champs and Cyclone Taylor "Host".  Therefore, Panthers to Cyclone Taylor Cup as VIJHL reps.

Keystone Cup
Western Canadian Jr. B Championships(Northern Ontario to British Columbia)
Six teams in round robin play. 1st vs 2nd for gold/silver & 3rd vs. 4th for bronze.

NHL alumni

Jamie Benn
Ryan O'Byrne
Taylor Ellington
Greg Scott
Kyle Greentree
Mike Hamilton
Jordie Benn

Awards and trophies

Cyclone Taylor Cup
2010-11

Brent Patterson Memorial Trophy
1988–89, 2009–10, 2010–11, 2021-22

Andy Hebenton Trophy
1987–88, 1988–89, 2003–04, 2007–08, 2008–09

Grant Peart Memorial Trophy
1988–89, 1998–99, 2019-20, 2021-22

Jaime Benn Trophy
Tanner Wort: 2019-20 (86pts: 42g 44a)
Riley Braun: 2021-22 (120pts: 43g 77a)

Doug Morton Trophy
Greg Wagnor: 1988-89
Aaron Lloyd: 1996-97
Daniel Bell: 2007-08 (64pts: 28g 36a)
Daniel Bell: 2008-09 (78pts: 32g 46a)
Evan Campbell: 2010-11 (87pts: 37g 50a)
Tanner Wort: 2019-20 (86pts: 42g 44a)
Riley Braun: 2021-22 (120pts: 43g 77a)

Jack Kingston Memorial Trophy
Mike Scarborough: 2009-10 (24pts: 3g 21a)
Matthew Seale: 2021-22 (52pts: 10g 42a)

Jamie Robertson Trophy
Greg Wagnor: 1987-88
Rob Olson: 1988-89
Gerry Baron: 1990-91
Craig Zubersky: 1998-99
Paul Lowden: 2002-03
Riley Braun: 2019-20

Larry Lamoureaux Trophy
Jamie Benn: 2005-06 (55pts: 21g 34a)
Payton Braun: 2021-22 (84pts: 41g 43a)

Ray's Sports Centre Trophy
Grant Sjerven: 1987-88
Corey Volk: 1989-90
Scott Ismond: 2006-07
Andrew Wilson: 2007-08
Brady Berisoff: 2008-09

Walt McWilliams Memorial Trophy
Dan Lapointe: 1999-00
Jared Molnar: 2004-05
Gregory Simpson: 2006-07
Logan Spiers: 2021-22 (103pts: 36g 67a)

Eddie Kingston Award
Brad Tippett: 2021-22

Most Points in a VIJHL Postseason
Riley Braun: 2021-22 (36pts: 11g 25a)

References

External links
Official website of the Peninsula Panthers

Ice hockey teams in British Columbia
1980s establishments in British Columbia
Sports clubs established in the 1980s